Hafsa Sultan ("Young lioness";  or before – 19 March 1534), also called Ayşe Hafsa Sultan, was a concubine of Selim I and the first Valide Sultan of the Ottoman Empire as the mother of Suleiman the Magnificent. During the period between her son's enthronement in 1520 and her death in 1534, she was one of the most influential persons in the Ottoman Empire.

Origins
The traditional view holding that Hafsa Sultan was the daughter of Meñli I Giray (1445–1515), the khan of the Crimean Tatars for much of the period between 1466 and 1515, resting on seventeenth century western authors accounts, has been challenged in favor of a Christian slave origin based on Ottoman documentary evidence. Only few historians still follow the traditional view, including Brian Glyn Williams. Reşat Kasaba mentions the marriage between Selim I and Hafsa Sultan as the "last marriage between an Ottoman sultan and a member of a neighboring Muslim royal family". Esin Atıl, however, states that whilst some historians state that she was the daughter of Giray, others have mentioned that the Crimean princess named "Ayse" was another one of Selim I's wives and that "Hafsa" may have been of slave origin. Ilya Zaytsev claims that "Ayshe (daughter of Mengli-Giray I)" first married Şehzade Mehmed, the governor of Kefe, and that she later married his brother Selim I; consequently, her marriage into the Ottoman dynasty was one of two noted instances of wedlock between the Girays and the Ottomans (the other being the marriage of Selim I's daughter to Saadet-Giray). Alan W. Fisher, Leslie Peirce, and Feridun Emecen all see Hafsa as of slave origin and not the daughter of the Crimean Khan.

Life

Having resided in the city of Manisa in western Turkey with her son, Suleiman, who administered the surrounding region between 1513 and 1520 (the town functioned as one of the traditional residences for Ottoman crown princes (veliaht şehzade) in apprenticeship for future power), Hafsa Sultan initiated the Manisa's "Mesir Festival", a local tradition continued today. She also had a large complex built in the city consisting of a mosque known as the Sultan Mosque, a primary school, a college, and a hospice.

As mother of new sultan Suleyman, in the 1521 she was also the first Ottoman imperial women who held title "sultan" after her given name, replacing title "hatun". This usage reflected the Ottoman conception of sovereign power as "family prerogative". Consequently, the title valide hatun (title for living mother of the reigning Ottoman sultan before 16th century) also turned into valide sultan, making Hafsa the first valide sultan. Her era signalled the shifting status of the sultan's mother and her increased share in power.
She was also the first harem woman confirmed to have a kira - Strongilah.

Death

Hafsa Sultan died in March 1534 and was buried near her husband in a mausoleum behind the qiblah wall of Yavuz Selim Mosque, in Fatih, Istanbul. The mausoleum was largely destroyed in an earthquake in 1884, a reconstruction effort started in the 1900s (decade) having been left discontinued, and her tomb today is much simpler than it was built originally.

Family 
From Selim, Hafsa had at least three children:

 Suleiman the Magnificent (1494, Trabzon - 1566, Constantinople); 10th Sultan of the Ottoman Empire after his father. 

 Hatice Sultan (1493?, Trabzon - after 1543, Constantinople). She married twice, she had five sons and at least three daughters. 

 Fatma Sultan (1492 or before, Trabzon –1573, Constantinople). She married at least twice. It is uncertain whether she had children.

To these there are two other daughters, whose motherhood of Hafsa is however discussed:

 Hafize Sultan (1492 or before, Trabzon - 10 July 1538, Constantinople). She married twice, she had one son. 

 Beyhan Sultan (1492 or before, Trabzon - 1559, Skopje). She married at least once, she had at least a daughter.

Representations in popular culture 
In the historical TV series The Magnificent Century she is played by the Turkish actress Nebahat Çehre. Here for plot reasons she is represented as the mother of Şah Sultan (one of other Selim's daughters by other concubine) rather than Hafize Sultan.

References

External links

 

1534 deaths
Valide sultan
16th-century consorts of Ottoman sultans
Suleiman the Magnificent